Naruphol Ar-romsawa(born September 16, 1988), simply known as Duong, is a Thai professional footballer who plays as an attacking midfielder for Thai League 1 club Nakhon Ratchasima.

International career

Naruphol is a part of Thailand's squad in the 2010 AFF Suzuki Cup.

International

Honours

Club
Buriram United
 Thai League 1: 2015
 Thai FA Cup: 2015
 Thai League Cup: 2015 
 Kor Royal Cup: 2015
 Mekong Club Championship: 2015

References

External links
 Profile at Goal

1988 births
Living people
Naruphol Ar-romsawa
Naruphol Ar-romsawa
Association football midfielders
Home United FC players
Naruphol Ar-romsawa
Naruphol Ar-romsawa
Naruphol Ar-romsawa
Naruphol Ar-romsawa
Naruphol Ar-romsawa
Singapore Premier League players
Naruphol Ar-romsawa
Naruphol Ar-romsawa
Naruphol Ar-romsawa
Naruphol Ar-romsawa
Expatriate footballers in Singapore
Expatriate footballers in England
Naruphol Ar-romsawa
Footballers at the 2010 Asian Games
Naruphol Ar-romsawa